Paweł Małek (11 May 1933 – 25 January 2019) was a Polish sports shooter. He competed in the 50 metre pistol event at the 1968 Summer Olympics.

References

1933 births
2019 deaths
Polish male sport shooters
Olympic shooters of Poland
Shooters at the 1968 Summer Olympics
People from Tarnów County